Huddersfield Town's 1941–42 campaign saw Town continuing to play in the Wartime League. They finished 11th in the 1st NRL Competition, 15th in the War Cup qualifiers and 6th in the 2nd NRL Competition.

This was also the last season in which Clem Stephenson was at the club. He had been at the club for over 2 decades as player and manager and has the longest managerial career in Huddersfield's history.

Sir Amos Brook Hirst also left the club to become chairman of the Football Association.

Results

1st NRL Competition

2nd NRL Competition
The first 11 matches of this competition, except the match against Grimsby Town took part in the War Cup qualifiers. The last 5 matches took place in the Combined Counties Cup.

1941-42
English football clubs 1941–42 season